Wolfenbüttel station is a railway station in the municipality of Wolfenbüttel, located in the Wolfenbüttel district in Lower Saxony, Germany.

References

Railway stations in Lower Saxony
Buildings and structures in Wolfenbüttel (district)
Railway stations in Germany opened in 1838